Eyüp Arın (born 19 June 1962) is a Turkish former footballer who currently manages Adanaspor.

Professional career
Arın is a longtime director of Adanaspor, and has taken the role of interim manager whenever the club experiences troubles in the Turkish leagues.

References

External links
 
  (as coach)
 
 Mackolik Manager Profile

Living people
1962 births
People from Adana
Turkish footballers
Turkish football managers
Mardinspor footballers
Adanaspor footballers
Süper Lig managers
Adanaspor managers
Association football defenders